Stackebrandtia albiflava is a bacterium from the genus of Stackebrandtia which has been isolated from soil from the Xishuang Banna tropical rainforest in China.

References 

Actinomycetia
Bacteria described in 2009